18th Street may refer to:

Los Angeles 
 18th Street gang, an Hispanic street gang

Manhattan, New York City 
 18th Street (IRT Broadway – Seventh Avenue Line); a subway station serving the  trains
 18th Street (IRT Lexington Avenue Line), an abandoned subway station; formerly serving the  trains
 18th Street (IRT Third Avenue Line), (demolished)
 18th Street (IRT Sixth Avenue Line), (demolished)

Chicago 
 18th Street station (CTA), a former 'L' station

Washington, D.C. 
 18th Street NW (Washington, D.C.)

See also